is a Japanese footballer currently playing as a midfielder for FC Gifu.

Career statistics

Club
.

Notes

References

2000 births
Living people
Association football people from Osaka Prefecture
Tokai Gakuen University alumni
Japanese footballers
Association football midfielders
J3 League players
FC Gifu players